Lisar Mahalleh (also Romanized as Līsār Maḩalleh) is a village in Khotbeh Sara Rural District, Kargan Rud District, Talesh County, Gilan Province, Iran. At the 2006 census, its population was 1,994, in 488 families.

References 

Populated places in Talesh County